Old New Borrowed and Blue is the fourth studio album by the British rock group Slade. It was released on 15 February 1974 and reached No. 1 on the UK Albums Chart. It has been certified Gold by BPI. The album was produced by Chas Chandler. For the album, Slade attempted to begin breaking away from their usual rock formula. For example, the singles "My Friend Stan" and "Everyday" were piano-led and did not have the typical "Slade" sound.

In the US, the album was released by the Warner Bros. label under the title Stomp Your Hands, Clap Your Feet, minus the tracks "My Town" and "My Friend Stan" (as they had been previously released there on Sladest).

Background

Old New Borrowed and Blue was recorded amid various touring and promotional activities in late 1973, and also during the headline-making recovery of drummer Don Powell, who was involved in a near-fatal car crash in July, briefly throwing the band's existence into doubt. Despite his critical condition, Powell was able to make a recovery and the band soon entered the studio to record material for their new album. During recording of "My Friend Stan", Powell was still walking with the aid of a stick and had to be lifted onto his drum stool. On the album, the band attempted to continue their usual formula on some tracks, while others took a change in musical direction. The album's title, as explained by Holder, came from the album's content, which the band felt had a mix of old, new, borrowed and blue songs.

"My Friend Stan" was released as the album's lead single in September 1973 and reached No. 2 in the UK. Over Christmas 1973, the band would also achieve success with their No. 1 single "Merry Xmas Everybody". Old New Borrowed and Blue was released in February 1974 and reached No. 1 in the UK. In the UK, Old New Borrowed and Blue was awarded Gold by BPI prior to its release, based purely on pre-order sales. At the time, a Slade spokesman had reported to the Record Mirror: "The album has sold twice as many cartridges and cassettes than their previous offerings." In March, the album's second single "Everyday" reached No. 3. In America, Stomp Your Hands, Clap Your Feet reached No. 168. "Good Time Gals" was issued there as a single in February 1974. Later in May, "When the Lights Are Out" was also issued in America and Belgium. Both singles failed to make any chart impact.

Song information

"Just Want a Little Bit" is a cover of the 1959 Rosco Gordon song, which was a minor hit in 1964 for Liverpool group The Undertakers. The song was later recorded in 1977 by The Animals too, of which Slade manager and producer Chas Chandler was bassist. At the time, the song was a regular inclusion in Slade's live set. "When the Lights Are Out" is the band's first track to feature Jim Lea on lead vocals. In a 1974 interview for the "19" readers, Holder jokingly commented: "There's nothing like a good singer and Jimmy's nothing like a good singer." The song was later covered by Bob Segarini in 1978 and American rock group Cheap Trick on their 2009 album The Latest. Lea would also record his own version with his brother Frank Lea under the name The Dummies in 1979. "My Town" originally appeared as the B-Side to "My Friend Stan".

"Find Yourself a Rainbow" features honky-tonk piano as the main instrument, played by Tommy Burton. In a 1974 fab club interview, Powell stated: "Pub piano is played by a local landlord, Tommy Burton. He now owes us free booze for the rest of the year." On the album's inner gatefold sleeve, the lyrics of the song include an extra verse which was not on the song's recording. "Miles Out to Sea" was another song to later be recorded by The Dummies. Of the up-tempo tracks "We're Really Gonna Raise the Roof" and "Do We Still Do It", AllMusic stated: "Slade fans can be assured that these guys hadn't lost the will to rock out."

"How Can It Be" is a country-flavoured track with acoustic guitar. "Don't Blame Me" originally appeared as the B-Side to "Merry Xmas Everybody". In a 1979 fan club interview, Lea said of the song: ""Don't Blame Me" was a time-filler, I think that it was created as that. When it was used as a B-Side, we didn't even know it was being used, it was chosen by the offices."

Chandler had persuaded Lea to finish "My Friend Stan" after he heard Lea playing the melody at home on his piano. "Everyday" also features piano and was released as a single at Chandler's insistence. Jim Lea was totally opposed to it being an A-side and argued with Chandler for the duration of a flight from the UK to Australia. When it was released, the band knew they were taking a risk but "Everyday" would become a firm favourite on stage. The song featured Lea on guitar as guitarist Dave Hill was away on honeymoon at the time of the recording sessions. "Good Time Gals" also featured as the B-Side to "Everyday".

Critical reception

Upon release, The Sun felt that the album marked the beginning of Slade becoming a "true album band". The reviewer commented that the songs were "toughening up" and the album was "expertly produced". American magazine Cash Box described the album as "another powerful collection of 'Toons'", with "raw power" being "the most immediate sensation you feel from the LP". At the Disc Music Awards 1974, the album was voted the tenth "best album of the year".

AllMusic retrospectively stated that the album saw Slade's "songwriting efforts" enter "more mellow pastures". In a review of Stomp Your Hands, Clap Your Feet, AllMusic said: "Full of trademark Slade rock & roll, Stomp Your Hands, Clap Your Feet continues the band's arena style stomp. Dated, a bit, but still rockin' hard." Bob Stanley of The Times retrospectively felt the album was the "pick of their early albums", stating: "This is joyous, unshackled and unpretentious stuff that reminds you how they rattled off six No. 1s." In 2010, Classic Rock considered the album "superior: reputation cementing" and noted the album's mix of "wistful ballads" and "mouth-watering commercial, hard rock nuggets".

Track listing

Charts

Weekly charts

Year-end charts

Personnel
Slade
Noddy Holder — lead vocals, rhythm guitar
Dave Hill — lead guitar, backing vocals
Jim Lea — bass, piano, guitar, backing vocals, lead vocals (track 2)
Don Powell — drums, backing vocals

Additional personnel
Chas Chandler — producer
Tommy Burton — piano (track 4)
Alan O'Duffy, George Chkiantz — engineer
Dave Ferrante — mixing
Wade Wood Associates — design
Ian Murray — art direction
Gered Mankowitz — photography

References

1974 albums
Slade albums
Polydor Records albums
Albums produced by Chas Chandler